Melanie Dawn Szubrycht is a female former British international track and road racing cyclist.

Cycling career
Szubrycht became British champion in 1998 after winning the British National Scratch Championships at the 1998 British National Track Championships.

She represented England in the road race and the points and sprint races on the track, at the 1998 Commonwealth Games in Kuala Lumpur, Malaysia. Four years later she represented England again on the track, at the 2002 Commonwealth Games.

Palmarès
1998
1st Scratch, 1998 British National Track Championships
2nd Points, 1998 British National Track Championships
3rd time trial, 1998 British National Track Championships
3rd Sprint, 1998 British National Track Championships

References

1969 births
Living people
Cyclists from Yorkshire
English track cyclists
English female cyclists
Cyclists at the 1998 Commonwealth Games
Commonwealth Games competitors for England